Pilaitė is an eldership in the Vilnius city municipality, Lithuania. It occupies 13,9 km². According to the 2011 census, it has a population of 20,320. Although being one of the newest elderships in Vilnius, with many buildings under construction, Pilaitė used to be a place with a medieval castle, rebuilt in Renaissance style in the 16th century, which guarded roads to the capital of the Grand Duchy of Lithuania from the West. The castle was destroyed during the Battle of Vilnius (1655) and was never rebuilt, but the place retained its name. It is mainly known to Vilnius residents by the two lakes it borders - Salotė and Gėlužis.
Pilaitė is also known for its old windmill, which is not far away from Salotė Lake. It is known that there used to be a farm near that windmill, with some of the stone structures still standing.

References

Neighbourhoods of Vilnius